The Christopher Columbus Monument in West Orange, New Jersey is slated for removal, as of June 2020.

See also
 List of monuments and memorials removed during the George Floyd protests

References

Cultural depictions of Christopher Columbus
Monuments and memorials in New Jersey
Monuments and memorials to Christopher Columbus
West Orange, New Jersey
Outdoor sculptures in New Jersey
Sculptures of men in New Jersey